MegaLink (also spelled Megalink) is a Philippine-based developer of mobile and banking software as well as a service provider for banks, specifically for automatic teller machine networks and point of sale systems of banks in the country.  From its establishment in 1989 until 2015, it pioneered the interconnectivity of several banks in the country by way of being the first interbank network with different banks as its members.

At the planned re-purposing and decommissioning, it had a total of more than 2,921 automated teller machines nationwide and handled more than 795,000 transactions a day. MegaLink was the largest interbank network in the Philippines with 13.1 million cardholders.

MegaLink was also known for its belief in universal sharing with the motto of "The Card for All."

By late January 2015, MegaLink and BancNet announced their merger. BancNet would be the sole surviving entity, while MegaLink would be re-purposed.  MegaLink now lists itself as a BancNet member, under the independent ATM deployer category.

Following the repurposing, MegaLink and its assets were sold to Japanese conglomerate Hitachi, of which it is now a subsidiary of the latter.

History

MegaLink was formed in September 1989 by Equitable Banking Corporation (now merged with Banco de Oro), Far East Bank and Trust Company (now part of BPI), Philippine National Bank (currently a BancNet member since Allied Bank merger was completed in 2013 as its surviving brand) and United Coconut Planters Bank, with its fundamental belief in universal sharing, it became the first operational shared ATM network in the Philippines.  MegaLink was launched on March 19, 1990, with shared resources of 88 ATMs, a base of 130,000 cardholders, and an average of 200 transactions a day.  MegaLink is the first Philippine consortium to link with both BancNet and Expressnet.

MegaLink Milestones:
1990 MegaLink became the first shared operational ATM network in the Philippines.
1992 The founding banks of ATM Bersama, an Indonesian interbank network, turn to MegaLink's expertise as their model for a shared services network which eventually led to a partnership.
1993 MegaLink launched the Debit Bills Payment over the ATM, as well as purchases via POS terminals. MegaLink also received the prestigious Asian Institute of Management Award for Information Technology Management and becomes the only ATM network to gain the distinction.
1994 MegaLink introduced telephone banking (Phonelink) as the world's first consortium-based phone banking facility.
1995 With its belief of universal sharing, MegaLink forged an alliance with BancNet for ATM transactions, and links up with Visa's Plus and Mastercard's Cirrus networks through Equitable Bank for international transactions.
 1996 MegaLink hosted the 1st Philippine Electronic Banking Conference and Exhibition attended by over 300 participants from the industry.
 1997 MegaLink interconnected with Expressnet for ATM transactions.
 1998 MegaLink activated the Automated Reconciliation and Settlement System as well as MIS with Transaction Query system to its members.
 2000 MegaLink successfully migrated through Y2K.
 2002 MegaLink launched the Exposure Limit Management System (MELMS) to manage inter-bank settlement risks.
 2003 MegaLink launched Electronic Settlement with Bangko Sentral ng Pilipinas  and becomes the first non-bank to participate in BSP's PhilPass.  MegaLink also established its Disaster Recovery Site.
 2004 Mobile Banking Service via Smart Communications, MegaLink Internet Payment Service via Union Bank of the Philippines's the PORT as well as Interbank Funds Transfer (IBFT)service were launched.
 2005 MegaLink is the first to implement full ATM switch outsourcing in the country with iBank as its pilot bank.  Debit Bills Payment via Smart mobile phones becomes available.
 2006  ATM Industry Association (ATMIA) signs up MegaLink as founding member in the Philippines counting the Philippines as its 50th member country.
 2007 MegaLink opens its membership to non-banks and accepts ENCASH Network Services ENS (The Philippines' first independent ATM deployer) and MASS-SPECC Cooperative Development Center (The Philippines' oldest cooperative federation.  MegaLink partners with MediLink, the first and only electronic claims network serving the Philippine healthcare industry, to allow MegaLink cardholders to pay for medical services in accredited hospitals and clinics.
 2008 MegaLink was admitted to the Asian Payment Network (APN), which counts ATM networks in Singapore, Malaysia, Thailand and Indonesia as members.  This membership paves the way for interconnection of ATM networks between member countries.
 2009 MegaLink hosted the 5th Asian Payment Network (APN) Forum attended by APN members from Indonesia (ARTAJASA, ALTO, RINTIS), Malaysia (MEPS), Thailand (ITMX) and Singapore (NETS).  ATM networks from Korea (KFTC) and the Philippines (BancNet and Expressnet), non-members of APN, were invited to attend as observers.  MegaLink also launched batch-to-online IBFT service.
 2010 MegaLink launched Load Fulfillment, Internet banking and Cross Border acquiring service (Mastercard and JCB). MegaLink interconnected with BancNet and Expressnet for POS transactions.
 2011 MegaLink interconnected with Korea Financial Telecommunications and Clearings Institute (KFTC) in South Korea for Cross Border ATM and POS transactions.
 2012 MegaLink launched its own Internet Payment Gateway service and implemented a Telco agnostic Mobile banking service.  MegaLink was elected as the APN chairman.
 2013 MegaLink interconnected with National ITMX in Thailand for Cross Border ATM and POS transactions and MegaLink re-launched the Visa International Acquiring service. MegaLink was re-elected as APN chairman.
 2015 MegaLink, through its member bank BDO Unibank and alliance partner BPI, was the first to introduce touchscreen ATM terminals via machines from Diebold.

Final members

Transferred to BancNet 
Banco de Oro
BDO Network Bank (formerly One Network Bank)
Coop-NATCCO
Country Builders Bank
ENCASH
GCash Inc. (formerly Mynt/ G-Cash Xchange, Inc.)
MASS-SPECC Cooperative Development Center
Pacific Ace Savings Bank
Union Bank of the Philippines

Defunct banks
Equitable PCI Bank (merged with Banco de Oro)
Planters Development Bank (merged with Chinabank)

See also
BancNet (the surviving ATM network in the Philippines)
Expressnet (MegaLink's alliance member, also absorbed by BancNet)
ATM usage fees
ENS
Nationlink
 Membership of  ATM Industry Association (ATMIA)

References

External links
MegaLink Public Website

Hitachi
Interbank networks
Financial services companies of the Philippines
Companies based in Pasay